Adolph Speyer (28 April 1812, Arolsen – 14 October 1892, Rhoden, Waldeck )
was a German entomologist who specialised in Lepidoptera, especially Hesperiidae.

Dr. Adolph Speyer wrote more than 70 papers on butterflies and their distribution.

Works
partial list

Speyer, A. (1848): Kritische Bemerkungen zu Herrich-Schäffer's systematischer Bearbeitung der Schmetterlinge von Europa, als Text, Revision und Supplement zu Hübner's europäischen Schmetterlingen. Erster Band. Tagschmetterlinge. Regensburg 1845. Entomologische Zeitung. Herausgegeben von dem entomologischen Vereine zu Stettin 9 (3), pp. [67–76.]
Speyer, A. (1848): Kritische Bemerkungen zu Herrich-Schäffer's systematischer Bearbeitung der europäischen Schmetterlinge. Entomologische Zeitung. Herausgegeben von dem entomologischen Vereine zu Stettin 9 (5), pp. [136–144.]
 Speyer, A. (1851): Eine Excursion auf den Patscher Kofel bei Innsbruck  Entomologische Zeitung. Herausgegeben von dem entomologischen Vereine zu Stettin 12 (11), pp. [329–340.]
Speyer, A. (1858): Verzeichniss der im Fürstenthume Waldeck im geflügelten Zustande überwinternden Schmetterlinge. Entomologische Zeitung. Herausgegeben von dem entomologischen Vereine zu Stettin 19 (1/3), pp. [74–83.]
Speyer, A. (1860): Einige lepidopterologische Beobachtungen und Bemerkungen. Entomologische Zeitung. Herausgegeben von dem entomologischen Vereine zu Stettin 21 (10/12), pp. [369–375.]
Speyer, A. & Speyer, A. ., 1862: Die geographische Verbreitung der Schmetterlinge Deutschland und Schweiz (zweiter Teil). Verlag von Wilhelm Engelmann, pp. 320, Leipzig.
Speyer, A. (1865) _- Entomologische Zeitung. Herausgegeben von dem entomologischen Vereine zu Stettin 26 (7/9), pp. [241–268.]
Speyer, A. (1866): Lepidopterologische Mittheilungen. Entomologische Zeitung. Herausgegeben von dem entomologischen Vereine zu Stettin 28 (1/3), pp. [65–76.]
Speyer, A. (1878): Die Hesperiden-Gattungen die Europäischen Faunengebietz. Stett. ent. Ztg 39(1–6), pp. [167–193]
Speyer, A. (Aug 1878): The genera of the Hesperiidae of the European faunal region. [Translation of paper from Stett. ent. Ztg]. – Can. Ent. 10(8), pp. [121–129,:144–154,:163–170]
Speyer, A. (1879): Neue Hesperiden des paläarctischen Faunengebiets. Stett. ent. Ztg40, pp. [342–352]
Speyer, A. (1879): Die Hesperiden-Gattungen des Europäischen Faunengebiets II. Nachträge. Das Flügelgeäder.  Stett. ent. Ztg  40(10–12), pp. [477–500]
Speyer, A. (1880) with Phillipp Klier Deutsche Schmetterlingskunde für Anfänger. Nebst einer Anleitung zum Sammeln, von Dr. A. Speyer.Leipzig,Oehmigke[1880] online
Speyer, A. (Sep 1882): Lepidopterologische Bemerkungen. Stett. ent. Ztg. 43(7–9), pp. [375–388]

References

Anonym 1893: [Speyer, Adolph] Leopoldina 29: 50
Elwes, H. J. 1893: [Obit] (The) Proceedings of the Entomological Society of London for the Year ... 1893, pp. LVII-LVIII online
Möbius, E. 1943: [Speyer, Adolph] Iris Dresden. Deutsche Entomologische Zeitschrift Iris, herausgegeben von der Gesellschaft Iris Dresden in Verbindung mit der Deutschen Entomologischen Gesellschaft zu Berlin-Dresden., Dresden 57:23
Staudinger, O.; Speyer, O. 1893: [Speyer, Adolph] Iris Dresden. Deutsche Entomologische Zeitschrift Iris, herausgegeben von der Gesellschaft Iris Dresden in Verbindung mit der Deutschen Entomologischen Gesellschaft zu Berlin. Dresden''., Dresden : 37–68
Walther Horn & Sigmund Schenkling: Index Litteraturae Entomologicae. Serie I: Die Welt-Literatur über die gesamte Entomologie bis inklusive 1863. Berlin 1928.

German entomologists
1892 deaths
1812 births